Delacroix is a Brussels Metro station on lines 2 and 6. It is located in the municipality of Anderlecht, in the western part of Brussels, Belgium. It is an elevated station, running parallel to the /, and forming a bridge-viaduct over the Brussels–Charleroi Canal, with entries and exits leading to and from both banks of the canal.

The station opened on 4 September 2006 as the southern terminus of line 2. It is named after the nearby street, which itself is named after Léon Delacroix, Belgium's 22nd Prime Minister. On 4 April 2009, the loop of line 2 was completed with the junction between Delacroix and Gare de l'Ouest/Weststation.

External links 

Brussels metro stations
Railway stations opened in 2006
Anderlecht